Nord-Trøndelag County Municipality was the regional governing administration of the old Nord-Trøndelag county in Norway. The county municipality was established in its current form on 1 January 1976 when the law was changed to allow elected county councils in Norway. The county municipality was dissolved on 1 January 2018, when Nord-Trøndelag was merged with the neighboring Sør-Trøndelag county, creating the new Trøndelag county which is led by the Trøndelag County Municipality. 

The main responsibilities of the county municipality included the running of 12 upper secondary schools, with 7,000 pupils. The administration is located in Steinkjer.

County government
The Nord-Trøndelag county council was made up of 35 representatives that were elected every four years. The council essentially acted as a Parliament or legislative body for the county and it met several times each year. The council was led by the County Mayor who held the executive powers of the county along with a smaller group known as the county cabinet. The last county mayor of Nord-Trøndelag, was Gunnar Viken (Conservative Party) while his deputy is Johannes Sandstad (Christian Democratic Party). The county cabinet was led by Anne Marit Mevassvik and has four members, from the Labour Party, the Conservative Party and the Christian Democratic Party.

County council
The party breakdown of the council was as follows:

County cabinet chairmen

2003–2011 Alf Daniel Moen, Labour Party
2011–2013 Ingvild Kjerkol, Labour Party
2013–2017 Anne Marit Mevassvik, Labour Party

County mayors

1963–1966 Johan A. Vikan, Centre Party
1966–1967 Olav Benum, Liberal Party
1968–1975 Knut Aas, Centre Party
1976–1991 Arne Sandnes, Centre Party
1992–1995 Kolbjørn Almlid, Centre Party
1995–1997 Bjarne Håkon Hanssen, Labour Party
1997–2003 Merethe Storødegård, Labour Party
2003–2007 Erik Bartnes, Centre Party
2007–2017 Gunnar Viken, Conservative Party

Deputy county mayors
1963 Martin Mørkved, Liberal Party
1964–1966 Olav Benum, Liberal Party
1968–1971 Petter Vekterli, Christian Democratic Party
1972–1979 Jarle Haugan, Liberal Party
1980–1987 Jon Åby, Liberal Party
1988–1991 Håvard Alstadheim, Liberal Party
1992–1995 Osvald Løberg, Socialist Left Party
1995–2003 Astri Wessel, Christian Democratic Party
2003–2011 Åse Marie Hagen, Labour Party
2011–2017 Johannes Sandstad, Christian Democratic Party

Schools
 Grong Upper Secondary School
 Inderøy Upper Secondary School
 Leksvik Upper Secondary School
 Levanger Upper Secondary School
 Meråker Upper Secondary School
 Mære Agriculture School
 Olav Duun Upper Secondary School
 Steinkjer Upper Secondary School
 Verdal Upper Secondary School
 Ytre Namdal Upper Secondary School

Subsidiaries

 Nord-Trøndelag County Gallery (Gallery)
 Nord-Trøndelag Elektrisitetsverk (Power company)
 Nord-Trøndelag Theatre (Theatre)
 TrønderBilene (34%, Bus company)

References

External links

Nord-Trøndelag
County municipalities of Norway
Public transport administrators of Norway
1837 establishments in Norway
Organisations based in Steinkjer
 
2017 disestablishments in Norway